The Papua New Guinea national basketball team is the team that represents Papua New Guinea in international basketball and is a member of FIBA Oceania. It is administered by the Basketball Federation of Papua New Guinea.

Competitive record

Summer Olympics
yet to qualify

FIBA World Cup
yet to qualify

FIBA Asia Cup
never participated

Pacific Games

 1963: 
 1966: 4th
 1969: 
 1971: 
 1975: 5th
 1979: 4th
 1983: 5th
 1987: 6th
 1991: 5th
 1995: n/a
 1999: 7th
 2003: n/a
 2007: 6th
 2011: 7th
 2015: 4th
 2019: 4th
 2023: To be determined

Oceania Basketball Tournament

 1981-2001: ?
 2005: 4th
 2009-2013: ?

Melanesia Basketball Cup

 2017 : 
 2021 : To be determined

Commonwealth Games

never participated

Team

Current roster
At the 2019 Pacific Games:

 
 
 
 
 
 
 
 
 
 
 

|}

| valign="top" |

Head coach

Assistant coaches

Legend

Club – describes lastclub before the tournament
Age – describes ageon 8 July 2019

|}
At the 2019 Pacific Games, Liam Wright played most minutes for Papua New Guinea and also recorded most steals for his team.

Depth chart

Past rosters
At the 2015 Pacific Games:

 
 
 
 
 
 
 
 
 
 
 
 

|}

| valign="top" |

Head coach

Assistant coaches

Legend

Club – describes lastclub before the tournament
Age – describes ageon 3 July 2015

|}

Head coach position
 Joel Khalu – 2013-present

Youth national teams
The country features several youth national teams such as the Papua New Guinea men's national under-18 basketball team and the Papua New Guinea men's national under-17 basketball team.

Kit

Sponsor
2015: City Pharmacy

2017: Pepsi

See also
 Papua New Guinea women's national basketball team
 Papua New Guinea national under-19 basketball team
 Papua New Guinea national under-17 basketball team
 Papua New Guinea national 3x3 team

External links
Papua New Guinea Basketball Records at FIBA Archive
Basketball Federation of Papua New Guinea Basketball - facebook presentation
Papua New Guinea National Team at australiabasket.com

Videos
 New Caledonia v Papua New Guinea - Final - Full Game - FIBA Melanesia Basketball Cup 2017 Youtube.com video

References

Men's national basketball teams
Basketball
Basketball in Papua New Guinea
Basketball teams in Papua New Guinea
1963 establishments in Papua New Guinea